Kodikamam is a small town in the Jaffna peninsula of Jaffna District, Northern Province, Sri Lanka.

References

Towns in Jaffna District